The 1896 European Rowing Championships were rowing championships held on Lake Geneva in the Swiss city of Geneva on 6 September. The competition was for men only, five nations competed (Austria-Hungary, Belgium, France, Italy, and Switzerland), and the regatta had four boat classes (M1x, M2+, M4+, M8+). At the FISA Congress held on the same day as these championships, four nations were represented.

Event schedule
Four races took place on 6 September 1896. As only five nations competed, no heats had to be rowed. The regatta used a 2000 m course:

2.30pm: French Cup (Coxed four)
3.30pm: Belgian Cup (Single scull)
4.30pm: Adriatic Cup (Coxed pair)
5.30pm: Italian Cup (Eight)

Medal summary
The following medals were won:

Footnotes

References

European Rowing Championships
European Rowing Championships
Rowing
Rowing
European Rowing Championships
Sports competitions in Geneva